Planet Mikey was a sports talk radio program on Boston's WEEI-FM 93.7 FM featuring Mikey Adams.  The show was officially announced on December 15, 2005 and ran from 6 p.m. to 10 p.m. on weekdays. In 2018, The Planet Mikey Podcast was created and is heard on iTunes, Stitcher, Spotify and Google Play.  In February 2020, Planet Mikey debuted as an afternoon drive radio show on 100.1 FM The Pike in Worcester, MA.

Mikey Adams was born in Pittsburgh, Pennsylvania and raised in Manchester, Connecticut. Adams was a disc jockey on several stations in Hartford and Springfield, Massachusetts including WPOP, WHYN, WAQY, and WCCC where he replaced Howard Stern in 1980.  Adams was Program Director at WAQY in Springfield in 1981 and was responsible for the format change from "Top 40" hits to classic rock in 1981.

Adams was sports reporter and anchor for WFSB-TV Eyewitness News in Hartford from 1986 until late 1991. 

He hosted a live, one hour nightly TV show called "Mike Adams' Sports World" on NECN from 1992–98 and won two New England Emmy awards. He was the first sports anchor on WFXT in Boston in 1993. He began at the WEEI in 1993 while anchoring at NECN and WFXT in Boston. He lives in central Massachusetts with his wife, Christine and two sons Andrew and William.

History
There was an open spot on WEEI programming in the 7 p.m.-to-11 p.m.slot after the departure of Ted Sarandis. Adams had been filling in as the host for two months and had reportedly given WEEI until December 14 to make a decision regarding hiring him as a full-time replacement for Sarandis.

Allegedly, programming director Jason Wolfe had not returned Adams' calls for a couple of days. Adams arrived early for his show on Wednesday, and Big Show host Glenn Ordway called Wolfe on the air with the goal of eliciting a decision on Adams future with the station. When Wolfe was finally put on the phone, he and Adams got into what sounded like a serious argument on the air that ended when Adams disconnected Wolfe. Until around 9:30 that night, Adams apparently locked himself in the studio not allowing anybody else inside except for food delivery people. Finally, Wolfe called in and gave Adams the job. 
WEEI reported that Wolfe received well over 1,000 emails from fans during the stunt, urging him to give Adams the job.

The lock-in was later revealed to be a hoax, as reported by a Boston Globe feature on Mike Adams. The station itself also admits it was a publicity stunt orchestrated by station management.<ref>

References

External links
Planet Mikey
Mike Adams Bio
Personal website

Sports in Boston
American sports radio programs